Hoseynabad-e Sargel (also Romanized as Ḩoseynābād-e Sargel; also known as Ḩoseynābād-e Sohrābī) is a village in Golashkerd Rural District, in the Central District of Faryab County, Kerman Province, Iran. At the 2006 census, its population was 220, in 41 families.

References 

Populated places in Faryab County